The Australian National Physics Competition is a student competition in university-level physics, first held in December 2003 in Australia. It is open to Australia and New Zealand university students, and contests are held in several categories, including experimental and theoretical physics. Prizes include financial awards, which in 2003 ranged around $1,000-2,000.

Winners

 Theory-Individual: Andy Ferris (ANU)
 Theory-Team: Canterbury University, NZ
 Best Team in Theory Section: Canterbury University NZ team: Peter Adshead, Grant McGregor, Angus Prain, Richard Taylor and David McCarthy
Experiment Section-Team: Byron Villis and Tim Williams

References

Education competitions in Australia
Physics competitions
Youth science
Student quiz competitions
Science events in Australia
2003 establishments in Australia
Recurring events established in 2003